Kalle Pohl (born 20 August 1951 in Düren) is a German comedian and actor.

Life 
Pohl works as comedian and actor in Germany. He plays guitarre.

Works

Theatre 
 2007: Norman, bist du es?
 2010: Denn sie wissen nicht, was sie erben
 2012: Ein schöner Schwede
 2012: Diskretion Ehrensache

Cabaret programme 
 1980: Musik ist meine Welt
 1983: Hausmeister gesucht?
 1985: Schangsong Pläsier
 1989: Rettet die Currywurst
 1996: Zwergenaufstand
 1999: Nach oben
 2004: Bettmän
 2007: Kalles Kiosk
 2011: Du bist mir ja einer

Music 
 1980: Wanna be a Schlagerstar, LP
 1989: Rettet die Currywurst, single
 2000: Dumm Sau TV, album
 2002: Immer auf die Kleinen, single
 2002: Ladykiller, album

Television 
 Ausgetrickst, ARD
 Star Leichtathletik, ARD
 Grünwald Freitagscomedy, BR
 Ihr seid wohl wahnsinnig! Die gefährlichste Show der Welt, RTL
 7 Tage, 7 Köpfe, RTL
 Manngold, comedy serie, TM3
 Das perfekte Promi-Dinner (2010), VOX

TV roles in 
 Großstadtrevier, ARD
 Ritas Welt, RTL
 SK Kölsch, Sat.1
 Brennende Herzen, ARD
 Der Schiedsmann, WDR
 Kalle kocht, RTL
 Die Märchenstunde: Frau Holle, Pro 7
 Tatort:  (2011)

Cineplex 
 Peanuts
 Hans im Glück

Awards 
 1988 Linzer Kleinkunstpreis
 1998 Bambi in category  best comedy show for 7 Tage 7 Köpfe
 1998 Goldener Löwe for 7 Tage 7 Köpfe
 1999 Goldener Gong, television award for team  7 Tage 7 Köpfe
 2004 German Comedy Awards, special award for 7 Tage 7 Köpfe

External links  
 Personal website
 

1951 births
Living people
German male comedians
German guitarists
German male guitarists
People from Düren
German male stage actors
German male television actors